The Fox and Anchor is a Grade II listed public house at 115 Charterhouse Street, Farringdon, London.

It was designed by the architect Latham Withall and built in 1898 by W. H. Lascelles & Co. Architectural ceramics and sculpture by Royal Doulton, designed by W.J.Neatby in the Modern Style (British Art Nouveau style)

References

Grade II listed pubs in London
Grade II listed buildings in the London Borough of Islington
Farringdon, London
Buildings and structures completed in 1898
19th-century architecture in the United Kingdom
Pubs in the London Borough of Islington